Maurice B. Biscoe (July 1871 – 29 December 1953) was an American architect. He worked in New York and then moved to Denver, Colorado. He returned to the east to work in Boston. His work was part of the architecture event in the art competition at the 1932 Summer Olympics.  A number of his works are listed on the U.S. National Register of Historic Places.

He worked alone and in a partnership with Henry Harwood Hewitt (1874 - 1926).

Works include:
 Richthofen Castle, 7020 E 12th Ave, Montclair, Denver, Colorado, NRHP-listed
 Bemis Hall, 920 N. Cascade Ave., Colorado Springs, Colorado (Biscoe, Maurice B.), NRHP-listed
 George W. Clayton Trust and College, 3801 Martin Luther King Blvd., Denver, Colorado (Biscoe, Maurice B.), NRHP-listed
 Frederick H. Cossitt Memorial Hall, 906 N. Cascade Ave., Colorado Springs, Colorado (Biscoe, Maurice B.), NRHP-listed
 One or more works in Country Club Historic District, roughly bounded by 1st and 4th Aves., Race and Downing Sts., Denver, Colorado (Biscoe, Maurice), NRHP-listed
 Dickinson Branch Library, 1545 Hooker St., Denver, Colorado (Biscoe, Maurice), NRHP-listed
 Theodore W. Richards House, 15 Follen St., Cambridge, Massachusetts (Warren, Smith, & Biscoe), NRHP-listed
 Smyth Public Library, 194 High St., Candia, New Hampshire (Andrews, Jones, Biscoe & Whitmore), NRHP-listed
 Langford H. Warren House, 6 Garden Terr., Cambridge, Massachusetts (Warren, Smith & Biscoe), NRHP-listed

References

20th-century American architects
Architects from Denver
Architects from New York (state)
Architects from Boston
1871 births
1953 deaths
Olympic competitors in art competitions